Leigh Bale is an American author of historical, contemporary romance novels.  She lives in Nevada with her professor husband.  She is a Publishers Weekly Bestselling author.

Biography
Leigh Bale was raised in small rural towns throughout the Western United States. She is the daughter of a retired U.S. forest ranger and penned her first novel on an electric typewriter, before she had any outline or clue what she was doing. She has worked as a bookkeeper and administrative assistant, but her first love, after her husband, is writing. Her stories have won the Romance Writers of America prestigious Golden Heart (writing as Lora Bale) and the Gayle Wilson Award of Excellence. Recently, Bale has penned a Forest Ranger series, a set of romantic stories centered around the life and work of a forest ranger. Her father is a conservationist rather than a preservationist and has served as her consultant for these books. Her contemporary books deal with real-life situations that many people can relate to and have received four star reviews from Romantic Times magazine. With a B.A. degree in History from the University of Nevada-Reno, Bale has also penned romantic historical novels.

Published Works

Leigh Bale Book List (as of 6/21/18) 

The Healing Place – December 2007 (available in Hardcover & French)

The Forever Family – August 2009 (reissued August 2018)

The Road to Forgiveness – May 2010 (reissued October 2014)

A Doctor for the Nanny – November 2015 (Lone Star Cowboy League – Series Book #2)

The Forest Rangers – Series

1.The Forest Ranger's Promise – May 2011 (available in hardcover)

2.The Forest Ranger's Child – June 2012

3.The Forest Ranger's Husband – November 2011

4. Falling for the Forest Ranger – January 2013

5. Healing the Forest Ranger – May 2013

6.The Forest Ranger's Return – February 2014

7.The Forest Ranger's Christmas – October 2014 – Publishers Weekly bestseller 10/7/14

8.The Forest Ranger's Rescue – March 2015

Men of Wildfire – Series

1. Her Firefighter Hero – May 2016

2. Wildfire Sweethearts – April 2017

3. Reunited by a Secret Child – April 2018

Colorado Amish Courtships – Series

1. Runaway Amish Bride – September 2018 – Publishers Weekly bestseller 8/31/18

2. His Amish Choice – November 2018

Romantic Suspense – Inspirational

Broken Trust – December 2013 (ebook only)

Historical Romance

The Heart's Warrior – 2008 (reissued July 2013)

My Heart Belongs to You – September 2014 (available in ebook & print copy)

The Silken Cord – January 2013 (inspirational; ebook only)

Medieval Romance Trilogy – October 2014 (ebook only)

Personal Information
Bale's daughter was diagnosed with an inoperable brain tumor at the young age of seven years. Bale's first published novel, The Healing Place, centers around a child suffering from an inoperable brain tumor.  Previously titled When Angels Fall and written under the name of Lora Bale, The Healing Place won the Romance Writers of America Golden Heart for best inspirational in 2006 and was sold to one of the final round judges and published the following year by Harlequin Steeple Hill. While this book is a fictional story, Bale lived the research and the novel includes events her family actually survived while fighting to save their daughter's life.  Bale's daughter is now a married woman and considered less than 1% survivorship in the world for her type of brain tumor.

Sources

External links

Leigh Bale at Harlequin Books
Leigh Bale at The Wild Rose Press
 

Living people
American romantic fiction writers
American women novelists
Writers from Nevada
American historical novelists
21st-century American novelists
Women romantic fiction writers
21st-century American women writers
Women historical novelists
Year of birth missing (living people)